Pygoctenucha is a genus of moths in the family Erebidae. The genus was erected by Augustus Radcliffe Grote in 1883.

Species
Pygoctenucha azteca (Schaus, 1892)
Pygoctenucha clitus (Druce, 1884)
Pygoctenucha enna (Druce, 1885)
Pygoctenucha pyrrhoura (Hulst, 1881)
Pygoctenucha terminalis (Walker, 1854)

References

Phaegopterina
Moth genera